The 2015 Presidents Cup was the 11th Presidents Cup, played at the Jack Nicklaus Golf Club Korea in Incheon, South Korea from 8–11 October. It was the first time the Presidents Cup was played in Asia.

The United States won for the sixth successive time with a 15–14 victory over the International team.

Course layout
Jack Nicklaus Golf Club Korea

Format
The format changed from previous Cup play. The first two days consisted of five matches of foursomes and five matches of fourball. The third day consisted of four matches of foursomes and four matches of fourball. The host team captain decided the order, fourball vs. foursomes, on the first three days. On the fourth and final day, twelve singles matches were played. 30 matches were played in all. All matches that are all-square after 18 holes scored  point for each team.

Each member of the teams had to play in a minimum of two matches in the first three days, a reduction from the three match minimum from 2003 to 2013.

Team qualification and selection
Both teams had 12 players.

International team
The International team featured the top 10 players in the Official World Golf Ranking at the conclusion of the 2015 Deutsche Bank Championship on 7 September and two captain's picks. The captain's picks were announced on 8 September 2015.

The final standings were:

United States team
The United States team featured the 10 players who earn the most official FedExCup points from the 2013 BMW Championship through to the 2015 Deutsche Bank Championship, with points earned in the calendar year 2015 counting double, and two captain's picks. The captain's picks were announced on 8 September 2015.

On 2 October it was announced that Jim Furyk would not play in the Presidents Cup due to a wrist injury, and would be replaced by J. B. Holmes. Furyk served instead as an assistant captain.

The final standings were:

Teams

Captains
Jay Haas captained the U.S. team, and Nick Price captained the International team. Haas served as the captain's assistant for the previous three U.S. teams. Price was the International team captain in 2013.

Fred Couples was a captain's assistant for the U.S. team, and K. J. Choi was a vice-captain for the International team.

Players

Captain's picks shown in yellow
Ages as of 8 October; OWGR as of 5 October, the last ranking before the Cup

Notables
Anirban Lahiri (India) and Thongchai Jaidee (Thailand) became the first representatives of their respective countries to play in the Presidents Cup. Phil Mickelson has appeared in all eleven Presidents Cups. Host country South Korea was represented with vice captain K. J. Choi, Danny Lee (who plays as a New Zealander, but was born in South Korea), and Bae Sang-moon in his last competition before his military obligation.

Thursday's foursomes matches

Friday's fourball matches
The American pairing of Zach Johnson and Phil Mickelson were penalised 1 hole after Mickelson played a harder ball at the par 5 7th hole, in contravention to a "one-ball condition". The one-ball condition states that a player must use the same type of ball throughout his round. The one-ball condition was in place for the fourball matches, although not for the foursomes. After his tee shot, Mickelson was incorrectly informed by a rules official that he was disqualified from the hole and Mickelson picked up his ball. The correct penalty was a loss of 1 hole, which was adjusted to the state of the match after the 7th hole. However, it was then too late for Mickelson, who could have played out the 7th hole. Jason Day won the 7th hole with a birdie 4. The match had been all square after 6 holes but, with the International pair winning the 7th hole and with the 1 hole penalty, the International pair became 2 up after 7 holes. The match ended up all square.

Saturday's matches

Morning foursomes

Afternoon fourball
By winning their match, Louis Oosthuizen and Branden Grace became the first International pair to win four matches, playing together, in a Presidents Cup match. Steve Stricker and Tiger Woods, in 2009, were previously the only pair to have achieved this.

Sunday's singles matches
The United States won the Presidents Cup for the sixth straight time, defeating the International team 15 to 14. American Bill Haas, the son of team captain Jay Haas, clinched the victory on the final hole of the final match. With Haas 1 up, Bae needed to win the 18th to halve the match and the Presidents Cup. Bae mishit his third shot, a chip, and then missed his fourth shot. Haas then hit his third shot, from a bunker, to 6 feet and Bae conceded the match. Earlier Branden Grace has won his singles match, becoming only the fifth player to win five matches in a Presidents Cup match. In the 2013 Presidents Cup he had lost all four of his matches.

Individual player records
Each entry refers to the win–loss–half record of the player.

International

United States

References

External links

Presidents Cup
Golf tournaments in South Korea
Sports competitions in Incheon
Presidents Cup
Presidents Cup
Presidents Cup